Tristan Lamasine and Fabrice Martin were the defending champions but chose not to defend their title.

Nikola Mektić and Franko Škugor won the title after defeating Ariel Behar and Andrei Vasilevski 6–2, 7–5 in the final.

Seeds

Draw

References
 Main Draw

Open d'Orleans - Doubles
2016 Open d'Orléans